The 2017 Poker Masters was the inaugural season of the Poker Masters. It took place from September 13-20, 2017, at ARIA Resort & Casino in Las Vegas, Nevada. The event was sponsored by Poker Central, and every final table was streamed on PokerGO. There were five No-Limit Hold'em events on the schedule with the first four events being a $50,000 buy-in, while the Main Event was a $100,000 buy-in.

The Main Event was won by Germany's Steffen Sontheimer, and he also won the Poker Masters Purple Jacket for accumulating the most winnings during the series.

Schedule 
The schedule for the 2017 Poker Masters featured only No-Limit Hold'em events. The first four events were $50,000 buy-ins and lasted two days with the first day ending once the final table was down to seven players. Those players returned the next day to resume play with the action streamed on PokerGO. The Main Event was a $100,000 buy-in and played out over three days. All three days were streamed on PokerGO.

Purple Jacket standings 
The 2017 Poker Masters awarded the Purple Jacket to the player that accumulated the most winnings during the series. Germany's Steffen Sontheimer won two events, and cashed four times on his way to accumulating $2,733,000 in winnings to be awarded the inaugural Purple Jacket.

Results

Event #1: $50,000 No-Limit Hold'em 

 2-Day Event: September 13-14, 2017
 Number of Entrants: 51
 Total Prize Pool: $2,550,000
 Number of Payouts: 8
 Winning Hand:

Event #2: $50,000 No-Limit Hold'em 

 2-Day Event: September 14-15, 2017
 Number of Entrants: 50
 Total Prize Pool: $2,500,000
 Number of Payouts: 8
 Winning Hand:

Event #3: $50,000 No-Limit Hold'em 

 2-Day Event: September 15-16, 2017
 Number of Entrants: 48
 Total Prize Pool: $2,400,000
 Number of Payouts: 7
 Winning Hand:

Event #4: $50,000 No-Limit Hold'em 

 2-Day Event: September 16-17, 2017
 Number of Entrants: 39
 Total Prize Pool: $1,950,000
 Number of Payouts: 6
 Winning Hand:

Event #5: $100,000 No-Limit Hold'em Main Event 

 3-Day Event: September 18-20, 2017
 Number of Entrants: 36
 Total Prize Pool: $3,600,000
 Number of Payouts: 6
 Winning Hand:

References

External links 

 Results

2017 in poker
2017 in sports in Nevada
Poker tournaments
Television shows about poker